Kateřinky (in German Katharinberg) is a town district of Liberec in the Liberec Region in the Czech Republic.

Neighbourhoods in the Czech Republic